Zane Radcliffe (born 1969 in Bangor, Northern Ireland) is an author from Northern Ireland.

Early life
Radcliffe graduated from Queen's University Belfast, where he was the editor of their student newspaper. After graduation, he briefly worked as a journalist for M8. In 1994 he moved to London to study advertising for a year, after which he took a job as an advertising copyrighter. He spent the following six years writing commercials.

Writing career
In 1974, he wrote his first short story, My Dog. In 2001, he wrote his first book, London Irish, which in 2003 won the W H Smith People’s Choice Award for New Talent. Six months later, he wrote his second novel, Big Jessie, and in 2005 wrote The Killer’s Guide to Iceland which is also published in Black Swan. Currently, he is a Creative Director at Newhaven, at an advertising agency.

References

External links
 Official Zane Radcliffe website

1969 births
Living people
People from Bangor, County Down
Alumni of Queen's University Belfast
Male novelists from Northern Ireland
20th-century births